Jordy Jafeth Evans Solano (born 17 April 2002) is a Costa Rican professional footballer who plays as a defender for Costa Rican club Saprissa.

Career statistics

Club

Notes

Honours

Club
Saprissa
Liga FPD: Clausura 2021

References

2002 births
Living people
Costa Rican men's footballers
Costa Rica youth international footballers
Association football defenders
Deportivo Saprissa players
Liga FPD players